Andrew Lloyd Webber: Now & Forever is a 2001 box set compilation album of the music of composer Andrew Lloyd Webber.

Released in 2001 and comprising five discs in total, the album's first three discs feature a selection of between three and five tracks from each of Lloyd Webber's musicals to date, roughly in chronological order. The fourth disc, entitled Hits & More, features tracks that were released as singles, and the fifth disc, The Vaults, features obscure and previously unreleased tracks.

The discs are contained in a hardback book, with copious notes on the recordings and their parent shows.

The tracks' lyricists include Tim Rice, Don Black, Richard Stilgoe, Charles Hart, Alan Ayckbourn, Christopher Hampton, Jim Steinman, Ben Elton and the poet T. S. Eliot.

Tracklisting

Disc One

Disc Two

Disc Three

Disc Four: Hits & More

Disc Five

Personnel 
Compiled and produced by Tristram Penna

Cover drawing by Ronnie Wood

Booklet notes by James Inverne

Special thanks: Don Black, Brian Drutman, Tracey Connolly, Richard Gates, Paul Jones, George McManus, Denis McNamara, Tim Rice, Dave Robinson, Paul Tucker and Clare Wood

Digitally remastered at Abbey Road Studios by Chris Blair and Tristram Penna

Designed by Dewynters

References 

Andrew Lloyd Webber albums
2001 compilation albums